Claudie Weill (1945 – 29 September 2018) was a French historian. She worked on the history of the German working world. She was also a specialist on Rosa Luxemburg.

Partial publications
Claudie Weill, Les cosmopolites - Socialisme et judéité en Russie (1897–1917), Paris, Éditions Syllpse, Collection "Utopie critique", févr. 2004,  (presentation), Phd (dir. Marc Ferro)
 Deutsche und russische Sozialdemokratie um die Jahrhundertwende
 À la rencontre de Rosa Luxembourg.
 Die deutsche Arbeiterbewegung 1844-1914, 1969
 Deux lettres inédites de Karl Liebknecht, 1969
 Le Syndicalisme en Allemagne, 1970
 Le Rôle de la social-démocratie allemande dans la formation de la social-démocratie russe, 1898-1904. 1973
 A propos du terme "Bolchevisme", 1975
 Cinquante ans de rapports entre patrons et ouvriers en Allemagne, t. II, depuis 1945, 1976
 Marxistes russes et social-démocratie allemande, 1898-1904, 1976
 Pavel Axelrod and the Development of Menshevism, 1977
 Nation et lutte de classe, 1977
 Les étudiants russes en Allemagne, 1900-1914, 1979
 Les Socialistes revolutionnaires, 1980
 Ein 'Modell Deutschland' in den Farben Frankreichs?, 1980
 Le Seminaire de Georges Haupt a l'Ecole des Hautes Etudes, 1980
 Le Lapsus des intellectuels, 1982
 Die Roten Studenten. Dokumente und Erinnerungen 1938-1945, 1982
 La "question des étrangers" : les étudiants russes en Allemagne ; 1900-1914, 1982
 Juifs en Pologne. La question juive pendant l'entredeux-guerres, 1982
 Introduction a l'oeuvre theorique de Staline, tome I, 1982
 Le Shtetl. La bourgade juive de Pologne, 1985
 Rosa Luxemburg aujourd'hui, 1986
 Walter Benjamin im Exil. Zum Verhaltnis von Literaturpolitik und Aesthetik, 1987
 Die Kopfgeburten der Arbeiterbewegung oder Die Genossin Luxemburg bringt alles durcheinander (Les gestations cerebrales du mouvement ouvrier ou La camarade Luxemburg met tout sens dessus dessous), 1987
 L'internationale et l'autre : les relations inter-ethniques dans la IIe Internationale (Discussions et débats), 1987
 Le roman de Tatiana, 1987
 Kautskys russisches Dossier. Deutsche Sozialdemokraten als Treuhander des russischen Parteivermogens 1910-1915 (le dossier russe de Kautsky. Des social-democrates allemands depositaires de l'avoir du parti russe 1910-1915), 1987

References

1945 births
2018 deaths
20th-century French historians
Place of birth missing
Place of death missing
21st-century French historians